Follow the Leader is the second studio album by American hip hop duo Eric B. & Rakim. Following their debut album Paid in Full (1987), Eric B. & Rakim left 4th & B'way Records and signed with Uni Records, a subsidiary label of major label MCA Records. They recorded Follow the Leader at Power Play Studios in New York City. The duo produced, composed, and arranged the album with additional contributions from Rakim's brother Stevie Blass Griffin, who contributed with various instruments. Eric B. & Rakim worked with audio engineers Carlton Batts and Patrick Adams on the album. In a similar manner to their first album, a "ghost producer" was brought in for two songs. In a 2007 interview with Unkut.com, The 45 King said he produced both "Microphone Fiend" and "The R". "Microphone Fiend" was originally made for Fab 5 Freddy, until 45 King gave it over to Eric B., the group's "DJ".

Reception and legacy

Follow the Leader peaked at number 22 on the U.S. Billboard Top Pop Albums and at number seven on Billboards Top Black Albums chart. It achieved higher charting than Eric B. & Rakim's debut album and serves as their best-charting album in the United States. The album produced four singles, "Follow the Leader", "Microphone Fiend", "The R", and "Lyrics of Fury". "Follow the Leader" peaked at number 16 on the Hot Black Singles, at number 11 on the Hot Dance/Disco, and at number five on the Hot Dance Music/Maxi-Singles Sales chart. "The R" reached number 79 on the Hot Black Singles, number 28 on the Hot Dance/Disco, number 41 on the Hot Dance Music/Maxi-Singles Sales, and number 14 on the Hot Rap Singles chart.  On September 27, 1988, the album was certified gold by the Recording Industry Association of America for shipments in excess of 500,000 copies in the United States.

Follow the Leader was well received by contemporary critics. Los Angeles Times writer Jonathan Gold viewed it as "far more consistent" than the duo's Paid in Full, calling Eric B. "a master of chill, understated beats" and complimenting Rakim for weaving "a laid-back web of words, his whiskey-smooth tenor less noisy but more intense than the machine-gun mutterings you hear booming from beat boxes, his keen rhymes all the more devastating for being near-whispered where lesser rappers would shout". In his review for The Village Voice, Robert Christgau found the duo's sampling as an improvement from their previous work's "Brownian motion" and complimented Rakim's "ever-increasing words-per-minute ratio—the man loves language like a young Bob D". Peter Watrous of The New York Times commended Eric B.'s mixes and described him as "a minimalist virtuoso". Watrous called Rakim "one of the most distinctive rappers in the business" and elaborated on his lyricism: "His voice soars as gracefully as a well-thrown football; it'll change direction on the spot. He will vary rhythms, pushing and pulling against the beat to highlight his lyrics. Insistent, cool and dedicated, his rapping has an urgency that makes the music much more than pop; it sounds like a musical version of a political, social vision.

In the 2006 book To the Break of Dawn: A Freestyle on the Hip Hop Aesthetic, author William Jelani Cobb later wrote of the album's significance:

In a retrospective review, AllMusic editor Steve Huey viewed Follow the Leader as an improvement over Paid in Full, commending Rakim's "agile, up-tempo lyrical showcases". In a dual review of both Paid in Full and Follow the Leaders reissues, Pitchforks Jess Harvell expressed that the high points of the latter album "are as high as any rap group has gotten" and wrote that both albums' music serve as "a reminder of a brief period where people thought they could become a millionaire on skills alone, where the reality of that was so far away that no one had to think about what being a millionaire would mean to the culture that nurtured those skills". In 1998, Follow the Leader was selected as one of The Sources 100 Best Rap Albums, and in 2005, it was ranked number 12 on comedian Chris Rock's list of the "Top 25 Hip-Hop Albums". The track "Lyrics of Fury" was ranked number five on About.com's list of "Top 100 Rap Songs".

The album is ranked number 979 in All-Time Top 1000 Albums (3rd. edition, 2000).

Follow the Leader re-imagined as Jazz 
Follow the Leader, re-imagined as Jazz is an instrumental reworking of the entire album by Jonathan Hay, Mike Smith and Benny Reid. The album spent four non-consecutive weeks at No. 1 on the Billboard Jazz Albums chart, dethroning Michael Bublé's Love. Eric B told Forbes, “Hearing the music faithfully arranged and re-recorded with the stellar group of musicians Jonathan Hay and Benny Reid brought together not only stays true to our original work, but elevates and highlights the core concepts we drew from 30 years ago,” Eric B. continued. “It really completes a full circle... We imitated jazz, and now jazz is imitating us.”

Rakim was quoted in HipHopDX as saying:

"The trajectory of this project is the ultimate blessing. It’s tapping into a divine consciousness and showing how the universe continues to spin full circle. Eric and I were always heavy in our influence from the jazz genre. Then three decades in, we are influencing a jazz album, then that album is coming back around to influence Hip Hop production greats like Whoo Kid and hopefully a lot more. We used to dig through the crates at record stores to pull vinyl instrumentals and sample them for our tracks and now Follow The Leader is on vinyl for another generation to expand on with next level music. It’s breaking new barriers, which is the core of Hip Hop culture."

Track listing
All songs were written and produced by Eric B. & Rakim (Eric Barrier, William Griffin).

Personnel
Credits for Follow the Leader adapted from Allmusic.

Patrick Adams – engineer
Carlton Batts – engineer
Eric B. & Rakim – vocals, producer
Eric B. – performer
Stevie Blass Griffin – composer, performer
Rakim – arranger, producer

Charts

Certifications

References

Bibliography

Cobb, William Jelani (2006). To the Break of Dawn: A Freestyle on the Hip Hop Aesthetic. New York University Press. .

External links
Follow the Leader at Discogs

1988 albums
Eric B. & Rakim albums
Uni Records albums
Albums produced by Eric B.